Class E el-8 (Cyrillic script: Ээл8) was a Soviet diesel-electric locomotive built by Krupp in 1933 with engines by Sulzer and electrical equipment by Secheron.

Powertrain
There were two Sulzer 8LV31 straight-eight engines placed side by side with a gangway between them. This arrangement had been patented by Eugen Zbinden and Sulzer, patent US1632209 of 1927. Each engine delivered 750 hp (continuous rating) making a total of 1,500 hp. Electrical equipment was by Secheron of Geneva and total power of the traction motors was 1,200 hp.

Service
No details of the locomotive in service are available.  It is not known to have been preserved.

References

Railway locomotives introduced in 1933
E el-8
5 ft gauge locomotives